Patrick Saward (17 August 1928 – 20 September 2002) was a professional footballer in the English football League and for the Republic of Ireland. He died of Alzheimer's disease in 2002.

Career

Club
Playing as an amateur for Crystal Palace, Saward joined non-league club Beckenham Town, where he started his senior career. In 1951, before he joined Millwall as a professional. He made 118 league appearances for Millwall before joining Aston Villa for £10,000 in the summer of 1955. During his time at Villa Park he won the FA Cup and the Second Division championship in 1960. He joined Huddersfield Town in 1961, playing 59 league games for the club. In October 1963, Saward signed for Crawley Town.

International
He played at an international level for the Republic of Ireland, winning 18 caps.

Managerial career
After retiring as a player, Saward joined the youth team coaching staff at Coventry City, before becoming assistant manager to Jimmy Hill at the club. In July 1970, Saward was appointed manager of Brighton & Hove Albion, winning promotion to the Second Division in 1972. In October 1973, following a bottom placed finish and relegation back to the Third Division, Saward was sacked and replaced by Brian Clough. Following his spell at Brighton, Saward coached in Saudi Arabia, as well as managing Emirati club Al-Nasr.

Later life
After retiring he stayed in Dubai until health issues necessitated a return to the United Kingdom to be near family. He died in September 2002, aged 74, as a result of Bronchial pneumonia.

References

Aston Villa Player Database profile

1928 births
2002 deaths
Association footballers from County Cork
Republic of Ireland association footballers
Republic of Ireland international footballers
Republic of Ireland football managers
Republic of Ireland expatriate association footballers
Expatriate footballers in England
Irish expatriate sportspeople in England
Irish expatriate sportspeople in the United Arab Emirates
Association football defenders
English Football League players
Beckenham Town F.C. players
Millwall F.C. players
Aston Villa F.C. players
Huddersfield Town A.F.C. players
Crawley Town F.C. players
Brighton & Hove Albion F.C. managers
Al-Nasr SC (Dubai) managers
Neurological disease deaths in England
Deaths from Alzheimer's disease
Coventry City F.C. non-playing staff
FA Cup Final players